Ptisana howeana is a rare fern endemic to Lord Howe Island, occasionally found in cultivation. The local names are horse shoe fern or king fern. A large plant, though not particularly tall. The fronds grow to four metres long.

The habitat is near streams in dense forest at the southern part of Lord Howe Island, near Mount Lidgbird and Mount Gower.

References 

 

Marattiidae
Endemic flora of Lord Howe Island
Ferns of Australia
Taxa named by Walter Oliver
Plants described in 1917